Bobin is a small town, located in the Mid North Coast region of New South Wales, Australia.

Nearby attractions include the Bulga and Ellenborough Falls.

It has one primary school: Bobin Public School (est. 1883)

The 1992 Australian animated theatrical movie, Blinky Bill: The Mischievous Koala, was filmed at a farm in Bobin.

Numerous homes and the Bobin Public School were destroyed in a fire, part of the disastrous 2019–20 Australian bushfire season. Fourteen homes were lost on one street in Bobin.

References

Towns in New South Wales
Mid North Coast